Page Township may refer to:

 Page Township, Mille Lacs County, Minnesota
 Page Township, Cass County, North Dakota, in Cass County, North Dakota

	
Township name disambiguation pages